The 2003–04 season of the Philippine Basketball League (PBL).

New theme
The Philippine Basketball League (PBL), in partnership with the giant network ABS-CBN through Studio 23 and ABS-CBN Sports presentation of the league, adopted a new slogan "Ito ang tunay na ligang bayan".

2003-04 Platinum Cup

Finals

Fash (formerly Hapee) leaned on a couple of three-pointers by Larry Fonacier in the last quarter of the deciding fifth game to down Welcoat Paints and clinch the championship. Fash coach Junel Baculi now match former Stag coach Alfrancis Chua as the winningest mentor in the PBL with seven titles.

Platinum Cup awards
 Most Valuable Player: Peter June Simon (Fash)
 Newcomer Award:  Jemal Vizcarra (Sunkist-UST)
 Most Improved Award: Niño Gelig (Fash)
 Sudden Impact: Dondon Villamin (Sunkist-UST)
 Mythical Five
 Peter June Simon (Fash)
 Rich Alvarez (Fash)
 James Yap (Welcoat)
 Jercules Tangkay (Welcoat)
 Ervin Sotto (Welcoat)
 Mythical Second Team
 Alex Compton (Sunkist-UST)
 Allan Salangsang (Fash)
 Marc Pingris (Welcoat)
 Paul Artadi (Welcoat)
 Willy Wilson (Welcoat)

2004 Unity Cup

Finals

Viva Mineral Water-FEU wins their first championship since joining the league in this same conference last year, where they lost to Hapee after taking a 2-1 series lead in the finals. Welcoat threatened to extend the series by taking an eight-point lead, 43-35, midway in the third quarter, but the Water Force ended their scoring drought with eight unanswered points for a 43-all deadlock entering the final period.

Unity Cup Awards
 Most Valuable Player: Arwind Santos (Viva-FEU)
 Top Newcomer: Boyet Bautista (Toyota-Otis)
 Sudden Impact Award: Aaron Aban (Toyota-Otis)
 Sportsmanship Award: Chester Tolomia (Welcoat)
 Consistency Award: Eric Dela Cuesta (Blu Star)
 Mythical First Team
 Jercules Tangkay (Welcoat)
 Chester Tolomia (Welcoat)
 Arwind Santos (Viva-FEU)
 Dennis Miranda (Viva-FEU)
 Mark Isip (Viva-FEU)
 Mythical Second Team
 Ronjay Enrile (Toyota-Otis)
 Warren Ybañez (Viva-FEU)
 Marvin Ortiguerra (Viva-FEU)
 Jason Misolas (Nenaco)
 Mark Macapagal (Hapee)

Occurrences
PBL Commissioner Chino Trinidad resign unexpectedly at halftime of Game three of Fash-Welcoat finals series, Trinidad admitted his frustration and displeasure on a display of defiance by Welcoat players following the choice of Fash' Peter June Simon as MVP over Welcoat' Jercules Tangkay. Deputy commissioner Tommy Ong was named interim chief of the league.

References

External links
 www.philippinebasketball.ph

Philippine Basketball League seasons
2003 in Philippine basketball
PBL